Tving is a locality situated in Karlskrona Municipality, Blekinge County, Sweden with 459 inhabitants in 2010.

Near Tving, there is a 212 metres tall radio mast of the Swedish Navy used for LF-transmissions.

References 

Populated places in Karlskrona Municipality